Leander Paes and Nenad Zimonjić were the defending champions, but Zimonjić did not participate this year.

Paes and Radek Štěpánek won in the final 6–0, 6–3, against Gastón Etlis and Martín Rodríguez.

Seeds

Draw

Draw

External links
Draw

2004
2004 ATP Tour
2004 Millennium International Tennis Championships